"Baby Don't Go" is the fourth single from Fabolous's fourth album From Nothin' to Somethin'. The video features Jermaine Dupri and is produced by him also. T-Pain contributes to the radio and album version. A somewhat similar instrumental for the song was used in Season 2 of Jersey Shore.

The song contains samples from "The Finer Things" by Chuck Stanley and "Let Me Get Some" by Whodini.

Music video

The video, which features Fabolous & Jermaine Dupri premiered on BET's 106 & Park on September 12, 2007. Larissa Hodge-Aurora and Shay Johnson, or better known as Bootz and Buckeey from VH1's Flavor of Love and Charm School make cameos. The video was shot at the New Jersey mansion of New York Giants defensive end Osi Umenyiora. T-Pain does not appear in the video.

Track listings
"Baby Don't Go" (Clean version)
"Baby Don't Go" (Dirty version)
"Baby Don't Go" (Instrumental)

Charts

Certifications

References

2007 singles
Fabolous songs
T-Pain songs
Songs written by T-Pain
Jermaine Dupri songs
Song recordings produced by Jermaine Dupri
2007 songs
Songs written by Fabolous